Charles James Luck (19 November 1886 – 1 February 1981) was a British gymnast who competed in the 1912 Summer Olympics.

He was part of the British team, which won the bronze medal in the gymnastics men's team, European system event in 1912.

References

External links
profile

1886 births
1981 deaths
British male artistic gymnasts
Gymnasts at the 1912 Summer Olympics
Olympic gymnasts of Great Britain
Olympic bronze medallists for Great Britain
Olympic medalists in gymnastics
Medalists at the 1912 Summer Olympics
20th-century British people